Maritime Launch Services (MLS) is a Canadian space transport services company founded in 2016 and headquartered in Nova Scotia, Canada. MLS will rely on Ukrainian Cyclone-4M rockets by Pivdenne to launch polar and sun synchronous orbit from Canso, Nova Scotia.  MLS is a joint venture of three U.S.-based firms.

Launch site
On March 14, 2017, MLS selected Canso, Nova Scotia as MLS's launch site. MLS has applied to lease 15 hectares of land outside the town from the provincial Department of Natural Resources, and construction was slated to begin in 2021. The $110 million rocket spaceport will be used to launch commercial satellites into space with a goal for up to eight launches annually.. After further delays, MLS received final approval for construction in August 2022 and began work in September 2022. MLS President and CEO Stephen Matier claimed that MLS is aiming to conduct a suborbital launch NET Q2 2023, before further developing the site to accommodate Cyclone-4M. The site is slated to include a 10-15 metre-tall control centre and rocket assembly facility, with a launch pad positioned 2.4 kilometres away, linked by a custom rail system for rocket transportation. It will be the only operational spaceport in Canada, after the abandonment of the Churchill Rocket Research Range in the 1990s, and the first commercial spaceport for orbital launches in the country. It is estimated that construction of the spaceport will take three or four years to complete.

Service
MLS hopes to launch eight rockets annually with two southward launch options. Option 1 is a Sun-synchronous orbit launch between 600–800 km, for smaller satellites, with a payload up to 3350 kg for US$45 million. Option 2 is a Low Earth Orbit launch, below 600 km in altitude, that will allow a payload up to 5000 kg also for US$45 million.

Rockets
MLS will rely on Ukrainian 2-stage Cyclone-4M rockets built by Pivdenne Design Office. The Cyclone-4M uses a Zenit-derived first stage powered by four Ukrainian-built RD-874 Kerosene/LOX engines and upper stage stack developed for the original hypergolic Cyclone 4 rocket. The first launch of the Cyclone-4M is expected to take place at Canso in 2025.

See also

List of spaceports
List of rocket launch sites

References

External links
 

2016 establishments in Nova Scotia
Aerospace companies of Canada
Canadian companies established in 2016
Transport companies established in 2016
Commercial launch service providers
Private spaceflight companies
Space industry companies of Canada
Companies based in Halifax, Nova Scotia